Methylobacterium radiotolerans is a radiation-tolerating  Gram-negative bacterium. It has been shown that it can use lanthanide as a cofactor to increase its methanol dehydrogenase activity

See also 

 Methylacidiphilum fumariolicum
 Methylorubrum extorquens

References

External links 
Methylobacterium radiotolerans NCBI
Type strain of Methylobacterium radiotolerans at BacDive -  the Bacterial Diversity Metadatabase

Hyphomicrobiales
Bacteria described in 1983